Pa Mazar (also Romanized as Pā Mazār, Pā Mozār, and Pāmzār; also known as Pa Mazar Nazdike’ Mo’men Abad) is a village in Kuh Panj Rural District, in the Central District of Bardsir County, Kerman Province, Iran. At the 2006 census, its population was 61, in 12 families.

References 

Populated places in Bardsir County